Scythris obscurella is a moth belonging to the family Scythrididae. The species was first described by Giovanni Antonio Scopoli in 1763.

It is native to Eurasia.

References

obscurella